Scott Haran (born 11 April 1992) is a former English actor, best known for the CBBC series Wizards vs Aliens. He also appeared in the TV shows The Bill and Upstairs Downstairs.

Filmography

References

External links
 

Living people
1992 births
English male television actors